Colin Gardner  (c. 1940 – 3 July 2010) was an English football official and philanthropist.

Career
Gardner began his career as a referee in the Football League. He then became chairman of a number of non-league teams, including Minehead, Gloucester City and Forest Green Rovers.

Recognition
Gardner was awarded a MBE in 2006 for his charity work.

Death
Gardner died of a brain tumour on 3 July 2010, at the age of 69, at his home in Minchinhampton.

References

1940s births
2010 deaths
English football referees
English football chairmen and investors
Members of the Order of the British Empire
Deaths from brain cancer in England
Neurological disease deaths in England
English Football League referees
20th-century English businesspeople